William Daniell (by 1531 – 1604) was the member of the Parliament of England for Marlborough for the parliaments of 1558 and 1559.

He was a justice of the peace for Wiltshire for 1573/74 to 1592.

References 

Members of Parliament for Marlborough
1604 deaths
Year of birth uncertain
English justices of the peace
English MPs 1558
English MPs 1559